My Tennessee Mountain Home is the eleventh solo studio album by American entertainer Dolly Parton. It was released on April 2, 1973, by RCA Victor. The house pictured on the album cover was the house in which the Parton family lived during the late 1940s and early 1950s.

Content
Largely a concept album about her childhood in rural East Tennessee, the album begins with a recitation of the first letter Parton wrote to her parents shortly after moving from her hometown of Sevierville, Tennessee to Nashville in 1964. Most of the songs are fond reminiscences of her youth and family, though in one song, "In the Good Old Days (When Times Were Bad)", Parton candidly admits that though she is grateful for the lessons the poverty of her childhood taught her, she is in no hurry to repeat the experience. The final cut on the album, "Down on Music Row", recounts her first days on Nashville's Music Row, trying to get a record deal, and thanking those who helped her along the way, making specific mention of Chet Atkins and RCA's Bob Ferguson.

Reception 

In a positive review of the album, Billboard said,  They named "In the Good Old Days (When Times Were Bad)", "My Tennessee Mountain Home", and "Down on Music Row" as the best cuts on the album.

Though neither the album nor the title single were huge commercial hits for Parton — neither cracked the top ten on the U.S. country singles or albums charts — they remain fondly remembered by her fans; the My Tennessee Mountain Home album is among the most critically praised albums in Parton's catalogue. The title track became one of Parton's better-known compositions.

Legacy 
In later years, Parton has used the song "My Tennessee Mountain Home" as a theme song for her Dollywood theme park.

In 2009, "Eugene, Oregon" and Parton's original recording of "What Will Baby Be?," two outtakes from the recording sessions for this album, were released on the 4-disc, career-spanning box set "Dolly." Parton would later re-record "What Will Baby Be?" for inclusion on 1992's Slow Dancing with the Moon.

In 2010, Sony Music reissued the 2007 CD My Tennessee Mountain Home in a triple-feature CD set with Coat of Many Colors and Jolene and they have never been out of print.

Track listing

Personnel
Dolly Parton – vocals, guitar
Jimmy Colvard – guitar
Jimmy Capps – guitar
Dave Kirby – guitar
Bobby Thompson – guitar
Chip Young – guitar
Pete Drake – pedal steel guitar
Don Warden – dobro
Bobby Dyson – bass
Jerry Carrigan – drums
Buck Trent – banjo
Mack Magaha – fiddle
Johnny Gimble – fiddle
Hargus "Pig" Robbins – piano
Charlie McCoy – harmonica
Mary Hoephinger – harp
The Nashville Edition - background vocals

References

External links
My Tennessee Mountain Home at dollyon-line.com

1973 albums
Dolly Parton albums
Concept albums
Albums produced by Bob Ferguson (music)
RCA Records albums